Alin Nicu Chibulcutean (born 20 November 1978, Sărmașu) is a Romanian former professional football player who played as a centre back.

Honours
Armătura Zalău
Divizia C: 2002–03

Notes

References

External links

Alin Chibulcutean at frf-ajf.ro

1978 births
Living people
People from Sărmașu
Romanian footballers
ACF Gloria Bistrița players
CS Pandurii Târgu Jiu players
Liga I players
Liga II players
Liga III players
Association football defenders
FC Unirea Dej players